Waldemar "Coroa" Gonçalves, also commonly known as Coroa (15 January 1906 – May 1963) was a Brazilian basketball player. He competed in the men's tournament at the 1936 Summer Olympics.

References

1906 births
1963 deaths
Brazilian men's basketball players
Olympic basketball players of Brazil
Basketball players at the 1936 Summer Olympics
Basketball players from Rio de Janeiro (city)
20th-century Brazilian people